Taylor James Clarke (born May 13, 1993) is an American professional baseball pitcher for the Kansas City Royals of Major League Baseball (MLB). He previously played in MLB for the Arizona Diamondbacks.

Amateur career
Clarke attended Broad Run High School in Ashburn, Virginia, where he played baseball, basketball and golf. He began his college career at Towson University. In January 2013, Clarke tore the ulnar collateral ligament of his pitching elbow, and underwent Tommy John surgery. He learned in March that Towson planned on ending their college baseball program, and transferred to the College of Charleston.

Professional career

Arizona Diamondbacks
The Arizona Diamondbacks selected Clarke in the third round of the 2015 Major League Baseball draft. He signed with the Diamondbacks and spent his professional season with the Hillsboro Hops of the Class A-Short Season Northwest League, where he did not give up a run in 21 innings pitched. Clarke spent the 2016 season with the Kane County Cougars, Visalia Rawhide, and the Mobile BayBears, where he posted a combined 12–9 record and 3.31 ERA in 149.1 innings pitched with the three clubs. In 2017, he played for both the Jackson Generals and the Reno Aces, pitching to a combined 12–9 record and 3.35 ERA in 145 total innings between both teams. He spent all of 2018 with AAA Reno Aces going 13–8 with a 4.03 ERA.

The Diamondbacks added Clarke to their 40-man roster after the 2018 season.

He opened the 2019 season with the Reno Aces. On April 20, he was recalled to the major league roster for the first time. He made his major league debut that afternoon versus the Chicago Cubs, recording three scoreless innings in relief and earning a save. His first big-league win came on May 25 at Oracle Park against the San Francisco Giants. He finished the season with a record of 5–5 in 23 games (15 starts).

Clarke joined a small group of Major League pitchers who picked up a win, loss and save in their first three appearances. In 2020, Clarke pitched to a 4.36 ERA with 40 strikeouts in 43.1 innings pitched across 12 appearances (5 starts).

Following the 2021 season, on November 30, 2021, Clarke was non-tendered by the Diamondbacks, making him a free agent.

Kansas City Royals
On December 1, Clarke signed a major league contract with the Kansas City Royals.

Personal life
Clarke was born with paralysis of the muscles on the right side of his face.

Clarke and his wife, also named Taylor, have twin sons together.

References

External links

1993 births
Living people
Baseball players from Virginia
People from Ashburn, Virginia
Major League Baseball pitchers
Arizona Diamondbacks players
Kansas City Royals players
Towson Tigers baseball players
College of Charleston Cougars baseball players
Hillsboro Hops players
Kane County Cougars players
Visalia Rawhide players
Mobile BayBears players
Jackson Generals (Southern League) players
Reno Aces players
All-American college baseball players